Yizhou or Yi Prefecture (宜州) was a zhou (prefecture) in imperial China centering on modern Yizhou, Guangxi, China. It existed (intermittently) from the late 660s to 1265.

The modern district Yizhou of Hechi city, created in 1993, retains its name.

Geography
The administrative region of Yizhou in the Tang dynasty falls within modern Hechi in northern Guangxi. It probably includes modern: 
Yizhou
Luocheng Mulao Autonomous County

References
 

Prefectures of the Tang dynasty
Guangnan West Circuit
Prefectures of Ma Chu
Prefectures of the Sui dynasty
Former prefectures in Guangxi
Prefectures of Southern Han